Colonel The Hon. William Le Poer Trench CVO, JP (17 June 1837 – 16 September 1920) was an Anglo-Irish politician and British army officer.

He was the third son of William Trench, 3rd Earl of Clancarty and Lady Sarah Juliana Butler.

He married Harriet Maria Georgina Martins, daughter of Sir William Martins, on 21 April 1864.

He fought in the Second Opium War between 1857 and 1858, commanding a ladder company at the capture of Guangzhou and Nankow, and was mentioned in despatches. He gained the rank of Colonel in the service of the Royal Engineers.

Between 1872 and 1874, he was Member of Parliament (MP) for County Galway, having unseated the elected MP, John Philip Nolan, on petition; the case was one of the most controversial Irish cases of its time and permanently damaged the reputation of the judge, William Keogh.

He held the office of Justice of the Peace for Westminster, London, Buckinghamshire, and Middlesex. He was made a Commander of the Royal Victorian Order in 1912.

He was scandalised by the marriage on 10 July 1889 of his 20-year-old son and heir, William LePoer-Trench, to a London showgirl, Isabel Maud Penrice Bilton, who used the stage name of Belle.  As a result, he did all in his power to dissolve the marriage.  When this was unsuccessful he stopped his son's allowance, and resorted to selling lands in order to diminish his heir's eventual income, but his daughter-in-law's income from the stage was too great for these expedients to have much impact.

References
The Peerage

External links 
 

1837 births
1920 deaths
British Army personnel of the Second Opium War
Commanders of the Royal Victorian Order
Members of the Parliament of the United Kingdom for County Galway constituencies (1801–1922)
Politicians from County Galway
Royal Engineers officers
UK MPs 1868–1874
Younger sons of earls
William